Fritz Coleman (born May 27, 1948 in Pittsburgh, Pennsylvania) is a retired weathercaster, who worked for NBC Channel 4 (KNBC) in Los Angeles, California from 1982 until 2020.

Background
After growing up in Radnor, Pennsylvania, he attended Salem University in West Virginia and Temple University in Philadelphia where he studied radio, television and film. Like many popular weather anchors, he serves as a reporter instead of a meteorologist since he doesn't have a degree in meteorology.

He worked as a comedian and disc jockey for several years and as radio personality "Jay Fredericks" at WBEN and later WKBW in Buffalo, New York. He left Buffalo for Los Angeles in 1980 to work as a stand-up comic. In 1982, he began work as weekend weatherman at KNBC and became the weekday weatherman in 1984.  He also hosted or appeared on a number of other KNBC shows, such as "It’s Fritz" (1988-1990) and "What a Week" (1990 – 1991).

He has written and performed two one-man theater acts, titled The Reception and It's Me! Dad! He received the 2004 EMA Community Service Award for his involvement with KNBC's 4 Our Planet, a children's program. He appeared in a supporting role in one of Raymond Burr's last Perry Mason television films, The Case of the Telltale Talk Show Host, in 1993.

He received a "thanks" credit on the film Wake Up, Ron Burgundy: The Lost Movie, an "alternate film" companion to Anchorman: The Legend of Ron Burgundy.

From 2009 to 2011, Coleman also did the weekday weather (in addition to KNBC)  for San Diego's NBC affiliate, KNSD.

On June 17, 2020, Coleman announced that he would retire on Friday, June 26 after almost 40 years at KNBC.

References

External links 
Biography at NBC Los Angeles

Notice for The Reception, written and performed by Fritz
14th Annual EMA Awards recipients and nominees
Well-Known Resident of Wayne & Radnor
Biography at Gail A. Stocker Presents Comedy Contact

American radio personalities
Television anchors from Los Angeles
Television anchors from San Diego
Television personalities from Pittsburgh
Television personalities from Buffalo, New York
Temple University alumni
1948 births
Living people
Salem College alumni
Journalists from New York (state)
Journalists from Pennsylvania